Philip VII may refer to:

 Philip III of Spain and VII of Burgundy,  (1578–1621), King of Spain, Portugal and the Algarves
 Philip VII, Count of Waldeck (1613–1645)
 Philip VII, Comte de Paris (1838–1894), grandson and heir of Louis Philippe I, King of the French